Thomas Guy Chisari (November 17, 1922 – September 5, 1995) was an American football coach. In 1948, he served as the head coach for the Catholic Cardinals football team at the Catholic University of America. He attended the University of Maryland, where he played football as a back. In 1941, while attending St. John's College High School in Washington, D.C., Chisari was named a Washington Post All-Met back.

Head coaching record

References

External links
 

1922 births
1995 deaths
Catholic University Cardinals football coaches
Maryland Terrapins football players